Cieca may refer to:
Cieca Adans., a synonym of the plant genus Croton
Cieca Medik., a synonym of the plant genus Passiflora